VANGL planar cell polarity protein 2 is a protein that in humans is encoded by the VANGL2 gene.

Function

The protein encoded by the VANGL2 gene is a membrane protein involved in the regulation of planar cell polarity, especially in the stereociliary bundles of the cochlea. The encoded protein transmits directional signals to individual cells or groups of cells in epithelial sheets. This protein is also involved in the development of the neural plate. [provided by RefSeq, Sep 2011].

References

Further reading